Medley Sailing Club is a dinghy sailing club on the River Thames, situated adjacent to Bossoms Boatyard opposite Port Meadow in Oxford, England.

The club is notable as the farthest upstream sailing club on the Thames and for its large fleet of British Moth boats.
It was founded in 1937.

See also
 Bossoms Boatyard

References

External links
 Club website

1937 establishments in England
Sports clubs established in 1937
Yacht clubs in England
Sport in Oxford
Sport on the River Thames
Organisations based in Oxford